Rael Dornfest is an American computer programmer and author. He was a Technical Fellow and CTO of Charity: Water, and was previously an engineer at Twitter. He was Founder and Chief Executive Officer of Values of N, creator of "I Want Sandy" and "Stikkit: Little Yellow Notes that Think." Previously, he was Chief Technology Officer at O'Reilly Media.  He began working for Twitter after they bought the assets of his company Values of N.

He led the RSS-DEV Working Group, which authored RSS 1.0 and is the author of Blosxom, a lightweight Perl-based publishing system.

He was Series Editor of O’Reilly's Hacks series, and has co-authored a number of books including Google Hacks, Mac OS X Panther Hacks, and Google: The Missing Manual.

References

External links

 @rael - Twitter page
 Rael Dornfest - Author bio at O'Reilly
 Hack Google - Article by Dornfest for TechTV
 Rules for Remixing (IT Conversations) at the 2005 O'Reilly Emerging Technology Conference

Year of birth missing (living people)
Living people
American male bloggers
American bloggers
Computer programmers
American technology writers
O'Reilly writers
American chief technology officers
University of California, Davis alumni
American technology chief executives
21st-century American non-fiction writers